Model-dependent realism is a view of scientific inquiry that focuses on the role of scientific models of phenomena. It claims reality should be interpreted based upon these models, and where several models overlap in describing a particular subject, multiple, equally valid, realities exist. It claims that it is meaningless to talk about the "true reality" of a model as we can never be absolutely certain of anything. The only meaningful thing is the usefulness of the model. The term "model-dependent realism" was coined by Stephen Hawking and Leonard Mlodinow in their 2010 book, The Grand Design.

Overview
Model-dependent realism asserts that all we can know about "reality" consists of networks of world pictures that explain observations by connecting them by rules to concepts defined in models. Will an ultimate theory of everything be found? Hawking and Mlodinow suggest it is unclear:

A world picture consists of the combination of a set of observations accompanied by a conceptual model and by rules connecting the model concepts to the observations. Different world pictures that describe particular data equally well all have equal claims to be valid. There is no requirement that a world picture be unique, or even that the data selected include all available observations. The universe of all observations at present is covered by a network of overlapping world pictures and, where overlap occurs; multiple, equally valid, world pictures exist. At present, science requires multiple models to encompass existing observations:
 Where several models are found for the same phenomena, no single model is preferable to the others within that domain of overlap.

Model selection

While not rejecting the idea of "reality-as-it-is-in-itself", model-dependent realism suggests that we cannot know "reality-as-it-is-in-itself", but only an approximation of it provided by the intermediary of models. The view of models in model-dependent realism also is related to the instrumentalist approach to modern science, that a concept or theory should be evaluated by how effectively it explains and predicts phenomena, as opposed to how accurately it describes objective reality (a matter possibly impossible to establish). A model is a good model if it:
Is elegant
Contains few arbitrary or adjustable elements
Agrees with and explains all existing observations
Makes detailed predictions about future observations that can disprove or falsify the model if they are not borne out.
"If the modifications needed to accommodate new observations become too baroque, it signals the need for a new model." Of course, an assessment like that is subjective, as are the other criteria. According to Hawking and Mlodinow, even very successful models in use today do not satisfy all these criteria, which are aspirational in nature.

See also

 All models are wrong
 Commensurability
 Conceptualist realism
 Constructivist epistemology
 Fallibilism
 Internal realism
 Instrumentalism
 Models of scientific inquiry
 Ontological pluralism
 Philosophical realism
 Pragmatism
 Scientific perspectivism
 Scientific realism
 Space mapping

References

Further reading

 An on-line excerpt stating Kuhn's criteria is found here and they also are discussed by

External links 
 Edwards, Chris. Stephen Hawking's other controversial theory: Model Dependent Realism in The Grand Design (critical essay), Skeptic (Altadena, CA), March 22, 2011

Philosophy of physics
Metatheory of science
Metaphysical realism
Scientific modelling